Sierra de las Nieves may refer to various places in Spain:
Sierra de las Nieves, a mountain range of the Penibaetic system
Sierra de las Nieves Natural Park, a protected area located in the range 
Sierra de las Nieves (comarca), a comarca in Málaga Province